Bowhill is a village off the A708, in the Scottish Borders area of Scotland, near Selkirk, by the Yarrow Water

Other places nearby include Bowhill House, Boleside, Broadmeadows, Ettrickbridge, Kirkhope.

Notable people
Lord Henry Scott (1868–1945), cricketer and British Army soldier

See also
List of places in the Scottish Borders
List of places in Scotland

External links
Bowhill

Villages in the Scottish Borders